Cesare Magni or Magno (14951534) was an Italian painter of the Leonardeschi school.  He was born and died in Milan, and was an illegitimate son of Francesco Magni, a member of a well-known family of that city.

Works
St Apollonia (1526, untraced), for Santa Maria presso San Celso, Milan
Altarpiece of the Virgin and Child with St Peter and St Jerome (1530, Pinacoteca Ambrosiana, Milan) 
 The Holy Family with St Elizabeth and St John (1530, National Trust, Attingham Park) 
Crucifixion (1531, Vigevano Cathedral)
Virgin and Child with St Peter Martyr and St Vincent Ferrer (1531, San Biagio, Codogno)
Fresco, St Martin and St George (1533, Madonna dei Miracoli, Saronno)
Fresco, Virgin and Child with St Sebastian and St Roch (1533, Berlin), for the oratory of San Rocco, Codogno

References

External links

Leonardo da Vinci, Master Draftsman, exhibition catalog fully online as PDF from The Metropolitan Museum of Art, which contains material on Cesare Magni (see index)

Year of birth unknown
1534 deaths
16th-century Italian painters
Italian male painters
Italian Renaissance painters
Painters from Milan
Pupils and followers of Leonardo da Vinci